Feit–Thompson may refer to:

 Feit–Thompson conjecture
 Feit–Thompson theorem